Eritrea is an opera in three acts by the Italian composer Francesco Cavalli. The libretto is by Giovanni Faustini. It was premiered at the Teatro Sant 'Apollinare, Venice on 17 January 1652 and revived in modern times at the Wexford Festival in 1975 under the conductor Jane Glover.

References
Brenac, Jean-Claude, Le magazine de l'opéra baroque online at perso.orange.fr  Retrieved 9 September 2011

Italian-language operas
Operas by Francesco Cavalli
Operas
1652 operas